William Corless Mills (January 2, 1860 - January 17, 1928) was a US museum curator.

Mills was born in Pyrmont, Ohio.

Mills specialized in Native American remains, leading excavations in Adena Mound, Ohio (1901)

Mills was the fourth curator and librarian of the Ohio State Archaeological and Historical Society (1898–1928), following Lucy Allen Smart. He also was
 member of the American Ornithological Union
 member and librarian of the Ohio Academy of Science
 member and president of the Wheaton Ornithological Society
 member and treasurer of the Columbus Horticultural Society
 charter member of the American Association of Museums (now the American Alliance of Museums)
 member of the Columbus Iris Society
 member of the National Research Council of Archaeology
 fellow of the American Ethnological Society
 fellow of the American Association for the Advancement of Science
 fellow of the American Anthropological Society
 assistant editor of the Ohio Naturalist
 lecturer in Sociology in the College of Commerce and Administration of the Ohio State University

Mills died in Columbus, Ohio.

Works 
 Excavation of the Adena Mound (1902)

External links 
 
 Picture and description of his work

1860 births
1928 deaths
People from Montgomery County, Ohio
American curators